Nomia may refer to:
Nomia, Laconia in Greece
Nomia (mythology)
Nomia (genus), a genus of bees